Virgin Mary, or Mater Dolorosa, is a 1597 oil on canvas painting by El Greco, now in the Museo del Prado in Madrid. It is considered as a weaker replica of a painting on the same subject now in the Musée des Beaux-Arts of Strasbourg.

Bibliography 
 Wethey, Harold Edwin; El Greco y su Escuela (Volumen-II) ; Ediciones Guadarrama; Madrid-1967
 Scholz-Hänsel, Michael; El Greco; Taschen; Köln-2003;

References

1597 paintings
Paintings by El Greco in the Museo del Prado
Paintings of the Virgin Mary